Robert Root-Bernstein (born August 7, 1953) (PhD, Princeton University) is a professor of physiology at Michigan State University. In 1981, he was awarded a MacArthur Fellowship, commonly known as a "genius grant."

He has also researched and consulted on creativity for more than fifteen years. Among other books, he has authored Sparks of Genius: The Thirteen Thinking Tools of the World's Most Creative People, Discovering: Inventing and Solving Problems at the Frontiers of Scientific Knowledge, and Rethinking AIDS: The Tragic Cost of Premature Consensus. In Rethinking AIDS, Root-Bernstein postulated that factors in addition to HIV may contribute to AIDS. Root-Bernstein is a former member of the Group for the Scientific Reappraisal of the HIV-AIDS Hypothesis, a group of AIDS denialists.

Root-Bernstein asserts that HIV, while involved in the development of AIDS, may be no more important than an accumulation of co-factors such as a history of poor nutrition, lack of hygiene, intravenous drug use, anal intercourse, as well as various infections and lifestyle diseases. In its April 2004 issue, POZ published a quote it attributed to Root-Bernstein: "Both the camp that says HIV is a pussycat and the people who claim AIDS is all HIV are wrong . . . The denialists make claims that are clearly inconsistent with existing studies. When I check the existing studies, I don’t agree with the interpretation of the data, or, worse, I can’t find the studies [at all]."

Books authored
 Discovering: Inventing and Solving Problems at the Frontiers of Science, Harvard University Press, 1989.
 Rethinking AIDS: The Tragic Cost of Premature Consensus, Free Press, 1993, 
 (with Michèle Root-Bernstein) Honey, Mud, Maggots and Other Medical Marvels, Houghton Mifflin, 1997.
 (with Michèle Root-Bernstein) Sparks of Genius: The Thirteen Thinking Tools of the World's Most Creative People, Houghton Mifflin, 1999.

References

External links
 Root-Bernstein's faculty web site at Michigan State University
 Brief Biography
 Creativity Blog at Psychology Today

1953 births
HIV/AIDS denialists
Living people
MacArthur Fellows
Michigan State University faculty
Princeton University alumni
American physiologists